Daniël Pieter Hugo  (born 31 March 1964) is a South African former rugby union player that played two tests for the Springboks.

Playing career
Hugo grew up in Victoria West in the Northern Cape and studied at Stellenbosch University. He made his senior provincial debut for Western Province in 1984 against Northern Transvaal at Loftus Versfeld and also scored a try in the match. Hugo played 146 matches for Western Province, 120 of which were consecutive and was he part of the Western Province team that won the Currie Cup in 1986 and shared it with Northern Transvaal in 1989.

Hugo made his test debut for the Springboks against the World XV on 26 August 1989 at his home ground, Newlands in Cape Town. He also played in the second test against the World XV.

Test history

Trivia
Hugo and his lock partner against the World XV, Adolf Malan had the honour of being the tallest Springbok players at 2.04m. In 2008 Andries Bekker became the tallest Springbok with a length of 2.08m.

He is the father of well-traveled professional rugby player Reniel Hugo, now playing for Toyota Verblitz in Japan after representing three South African provinces.

See also
List of South Africa national rugby union players – Springbok no. 555

References

1958 births
Living people
South African rugby union players
South Africa international rugby union players
Western Province (rugby union) players
Stellenbosch University alumni
People from Victoria West
Rugby union players from the Northern Cape
Rugby union locks